Mallarani is a Rural municipality located within the Pyuthan District of the Lumbini Province of Nepal.
The rural municipality spans  of area, with a total population of 17,686 according to a 2011 Nepal census.

On March 10, 2017, the Government of Nepal restructured the local level bodies into 753 new local level structures.
The previous Chunja, Dharampani, portion of Raspurkot VDCs and some part of old Pyuthan Municipality were merged to form Mallarani Rural Municipality.
Mallarani is divided into 5 wards, with old headquarter of Pyuthan Municipality declared the administrative center of the rural municipality.

References

External links
official website of the rural municipality

Rural municipalities in Pyuthan District
Rural municipalities of Nepal established in 2017